The Social Democrats for the Development of Georgia (SDD) is a political party in Georgia. It was founded in February
2010 and  admitted into the Socialist International as a consultative member in February 2013.

The party held six MPs in the Parliament of Georgia and was a member of the Georgian Dream coalition until 2019, when it left the coalition because of disagreements about pensions and justice reforms.

References

External links
Official website

2010 establishments in Georgia (country)
Consultative member parties of the Socialist International
Political parties established in 2010
Political parties in Georgia (country)
Pro-European political parties in Georgia (country)
Social democratic parties in Asia
Social democratic parties in Europe
Social democratic parties in Georgia (country)
Centre-left parties in Georgia (country)